Balldale is a town in the mid-southern part of the Riverina in New South Wales, Australia.

Balldale was established when the large farm holding of the Quat Quatta Estate was sub-divided in the early 1900s.

Balldale Post Office opened on 1 June 1905.

The Balldale Hotel was built in 1905 by Albert Beard.

Balldale Football Club
Balldale FC commenced played in the following Australian Rules Football competitions in 1906, in the green and black colours initially, before the club eventually folded in 1977.

In early April, 1927, Alby Anderson was appointed as the coach of Balldale in the Riverina Football Association; his father Bill owned the Carnsdale Hotel in Balldale at the time. Interestingly, in late April 1927,  Anderson was granted a permit by the VFL from Richmond to the  Albury Football Club in the Ovens & Murray Football League, but he definitely played with Balldale in 1927.

Walter Longmire (John Longmire’s grandfather) represented NSW v South Australia at the MCG in 1927.

In 1930, Mr. Jack Anderson - Balldale FC, tied for the Pearce Medal for the best and fairest player award in the Corowa & District Football Association

Either A. or G.Bishop of Balldale trained with Essendon in March, 1933.

Frank Anderson was the winner of the 1935 club best and fairest award. Anderson polled 25 votes, second was Walter Longmire on 19 votes, with Boyle, third on 9 votes. In September, 1935, Anderson went to Melbourne to try out with Collingwood Football Club. He returned to play with Balldale in 1936 and won the best and fairest again in 1937.

Mr. Jim Steigenberger was appointed as captain / coach for Balldale in 1937 and 1938

In 1939, the Balldale's club jumper colors were royal Blue and gold braces.

George Willis won the club best and fairest award in 1939

Former Balldale player, Frank Anderson, younger brother of former St.Kilda player, Jack Anderson made his VFL debut with North Melbourne in June 1942.

The club best and fairest winner in 1946 was "Snow" Seymour.

In 1947, when Balldale FC re-entered the Hume Football League, club President, Mr. Kelly Joseph Azzi, donated a medal for the Hume FL best and fairest award and to this day it is still called the Azzi Medal.

J Edmunds was the winner of the 1949 club best and fairest award.

In 1953, Tom McCann was reappointed as the coach and Colin Wilson won the club best and fairest award.

Football Competitions Timeline
1906 & 1907: Corowa & District Football Association
1908: Federal Football Association 
1909: Ovens and Murray Football League
1910 & 1911: Culcairn & District Football Association
1912 & 1913: Rutherglen & District Football Association
1914 & 1915: Coreen Shire Football Association
1916 & 1917: In recess due to World War I
1918: the club was reformed, but played in no official competition. They played several friendly matches against other local towns.
1919 to 1923: Coreen & District Football Association
1924 to 1929: Riverina Football Association
1930 to 1934: Corowa & District Football Association
1935 to 1940: Chiltern & District Football Association
1941 to 1944: Club in recess due to World War II
1945: Hume Football League
1946: Chiltern & District Football Association
1947 to 1975: Hume Football League
1976 to 1977: Coreen & District Football League

Premierships
 Federal District Football Association
1908: Balldale: 3.4 - 22 defeated Daysdale: 1.10 - 16, at Buraja.
Coreen & District Football League
1921: Balldale: 7.9 - 51 defeated Buraja: 2.10 - 22
1922: Balldale: 6.9 - 45 defeated Buraja: 6.7 - 43
1923: Balldale: 10.5 - 65 defeated Daysdale: 3.5 - 23
 Corowa & District Football Association
1930: Balldale: 10.12 - 72 defeated Brocklesby: 8.8 - 56
1931: Balldale: 9.12 - 66 defeated Coreen: 6.13 - 49
1932: Balldale: 18.11 - 119 defeated Daysdale: 11.19 - 85
1934: Balldale: 12.15 - 87 defeated Coreen: 8.11 - 59
 Hume Football League
 1962: Balldale: 8.21 - 69 defeated Jindera: 5.8 - 38
 1972: Balldale: 14.17 - 101 defeated Walla Walla: 14.12 - 96

Runners Up
Riverina Football Association: 
1924: Brocklesby: 7.13 - 55 defeated Balldale: 7.7 - 49
Hume Football League
1956: Jindera: 11.12 - 78 defeated Balldale: 10.13 - 73
1961: Jindera: 10.8 - 68 defeated Balldale: 9.7 - 61

VFL Players
The following footballers played with Balldale FC prior to playing VFL football.
 1913 - Richard "Dick" Fitzgerald - South Melbourne
 1911 - George Anderson - Collingwood
 1931 - Jack Anderson - St. Kilda
 1942 - Frank Anderson - North Melbourne

Notes and references

External links

 Balldale Railway Siding
 1930 - Corowa & District FA Premiers: Balldale FC team photo
1938 - Chiltern & DFA defeated Preliminary Finalists: Balldale FC team photo
 1948 - Balldale FC team photo
 1962 & 1972 Balldale FC Past Player’s Photo
 The Balldale / Longmire Connection
 Hume FNL - Hall of Fame: Mr. Kelly J. Azzi

Towns in the Riverina
Towns in New South Wales
Federation Council, New South Wales